Belli Naaga (Kannada: ಬೆಳ್ಳಿನಾಗ) is a 1986 Indian Kannada film,  directed by  N. S. Dhananjaya (Datthu) and produced by A. R. Raju. The film stars Tiger Prabhakar, Nalini, Dinesh and Sudarshan in the lead roles. The film has musical score by Chellapilla Satyam.

Cast

Tiger Prabhakar
Nalini
Dinesh
Sudarshan
Rajanand
Master Rohith
Master Vasanth
Master Rajesh
Aruru Sathyabhama
K. N. Bharathi
Shanthamma
Archana
Lalithamma
Mysore Lokesh
Shankar Rao
Gangadhar Swamy
Srinivasa Murthy
Thyagaraj Urs
B. K. Shankar
Jaggu
Surendra
Aravind
Dayanand Sagar
Prakash
Stanly
Sampath Kumar
Baby Geetha
Shakti Prasad in Guest Appearance
Kunigal Nagabhushan in Guest Appearance

References

External links
 

1986 films
1980s Kannada-language films